Tyler Stone may refer to:

 Tyler Stone (Marvel Comics), a Marvel Comics character
 Tyler Stone (basketball) (born 1991), American basketball player